Pith was a four-seat supper club in New York City that was open from September 2015 until May 31, 2016.

History
Pith was first opened in September 2015 by Columbia University student Jonah Reider in his dorm room in Hogan Hall. Reider, a native of Newton, Massachusetts, has no culinary training but comes from a family that loves cooking. Originally, Reider would regularly cook four-course meals for his friends there; these meals gained greater attention when the university newspaper (and, later, the New York Post) wrote about him. Reider officially opened Pith later that month, and by the next month, reservations for it were booked for the rest of the year. He later relocated the club to his off-campus apartment, and he hired United Talent Agency to represent him. In April 2016, Reider's landlord emailed him to tell him that he would terminate Reider's lease on May 31, 2016.

See also
 List of supper clubs

References

Restaurants established in 2015
Defunct restaurants in New York City
Restaurants disestablished in 2016
Supper clubs